Dorothee Rätsch (also spelled Raetsch; born 1940 in Heilsberg, today Lidzbark Warmiński, Poland) is a German sculptor and graphic artist, the daughter of Margarete Neumann, a writer and poet.

Biography 

Up to 1945 Dorothee Rätsch was living in Heilsberg, along with her mother and her sibling. Her Mother, widowed in World War II, worked as a welfare worker. In 1945 they fled from East Prussia westward to Mecklenburg.

In child and youth courses Dorothee Rätsch started early, to engage with the visual arts.
Later, in addition to training and work in agriculture, she attended the evening high school and worked in courses and programs at their artistic skills.

After an entrance examination, Dorothee Rätsch was accepted and became a member of the Association of Artists of the GDR (Verband Bildender Künstler der DDR) in 1971. Since then, she participated in numerous national and international exhibitions and plein airs. Now she is only active regionally in Mecklenburg-Vorpommern, such as in the statewide campaigns KUNST OFFEN (Artists are open up their studios to visitors) and Offene Gärten (open gardens).

Today Dorothee Rätsch lives and works in Passentin (Mecklenburg-Vorpommern), where they 1994–1999 built up the Slavic Village Passentin, as an authentic early medieval place of learning and experience (Idea, concept planning and oversee the construction: Dorothee Rätsch). Always it was especially important for them to work with children and young people, as course leader. 
Also she has established a sculpture garden beside her studio.

Sculptures 

In bronze, terracotta and wood emerge small sculptures, medals and figurative sculptures and reliefs.

Awards 

Fritz-Reuter-Price
1999 Heinrich-Schliemann-medal

References

External links 
 
 Website of Dorothee Rätsch

Contemporary sculptors
German contemporary artists
1940 births
German women artists
Living people
People from East Prussia
People from Lidzbark Warmiński